Gymnobela santorsolae is an extinct species of sea snail, a marine gastropod mollusk in the family Raphitomidae.

Description

Distribution
Fossils of this marine species were found in Italy.

References

 Tabanelli C. (2018). Una specie fossile di grande profondità: Gymnobela santorsolae n. sp. (Mollusca: Gastropoda: Raphitomidae). Quaderno di Studi e Notizie di Storia Naturale della Romagna. 47: 1–7.

santorsolae
Gastropods described in 2018